Spartaeus is a genus of Asian jumping spiders that was first described by Tamerlan Thorell in 1891. These spiders build large sheet webs on tree trunks to capture prey, mostly moths. When walking, they wave their palps and legs in an unusual way.

The genus was renamed from Boethus in 1984 because the name was found to be preoccupied.

Species
 it contains nineteen species, found only in Asia:
Spartaeus abramovi Logunov & Azarkina, 2008 – Vietnam
Spartaeus bani (Ikeda, 1995) – Japan
Spartaeus banthamus Logunov & Azarkina, 2008 – Laos
Spartaeus ellipticus Bao & Peng, 2002 – Taiwan
Spartaeus emeishan Zhu, Yang & Zhang, 2007 – China
Spartaeus forcipiformis Yang, W. Liu, P. Liu & Peng, 2017 – China
Spartaeus jaegeri Logunov & Azarkina, 2008 – Laos
Spartaeus jianfengensis Song & Chai, 1991 – China
Spartaeus noctivagus Logunov & Azarkina, 2008 – Laos
Spartaeus pinniformis Yang, W. Liu, P. Liu & Peng, 2017 – China
Spartaeus platnicki Song, Chen & Gong, 1991 – China
Spartaeus serratus Yang, W. Liu, P. Liu & Peng, 2017 – China
Spartaeus spinimanus (Thorell, 1878) (type) – Sri Lanka to Indonesia (Borneo, Sumbawa)
Spartaeus tengchongensis Yang, W. Liu, P. Liu & Peng, 2017 – China
Spartaeus thailandicus Wanless, 1984 – China, Thailand
Spartaeus triapiculus Yang, W. Liu, P. Liu & Peng, 2017 – China
Spartaeus uplandicus Barrion & Litsinger, 1995 – Philippines
Spartaeus wildtrackii Wanless, 1987 – Malaysia
Spartaeus zhangi Peng & Li, 2002 – China, Laos

References

Salticidae genera
Salticidae
Spiders of Asia
Taxa named by Tamerlan Thorell